Nanti is an Arawakan language spoken by approximately 250 people in southeastern Peruvian Amazonia, principally in a number of small communities located near the headwaters of the Camisea and Timpía Rivers. It belongs to the Kampan branch of the Arawak family, and is most closely related to Matsigenka, with which it is partially mutually intelligible.,

The language is also sometimes called Kogapakori (variants: Cogapacori, Kugapakori), a pejorative term of Matsigenka origin meaning 'violent person'.

References

Recordings 
 Nanti Collection of Christine Beier and Lev Michael at the Archive of the Indigenous Languages of Latin America. Contains four recordings of ceremonies in Nanti with transcriptions and translations.

Bibliography
Crowhurst, Megan and Lev Michael. 2005. Iterative footing and prominence-driven stress in Nanti (Kampa). Language 81(1):47-95.
Michael, Lev. 2012. Nanti self-quotation: Implications for the pragmatics of reported speech and evidentiality. Pragmatics and Society 3(2):321-357.
Michael, Lev. 2012. Possession in Nanti. In Alexandra Aikhenvald and R.M.W. Dixon (eds.), Possession and Ownership: A cross-linguistic typology, pp. 149–166 . Oxford University Press.
Michael, Lev. 2005. El estatus sintáctico de los marcadores de persona en el idioma Nanti (Campa, Arawak). Lengua y Sociedad. 7(2):21-32.

Languages of Peru
Campa languages